is the seventh opening theme song from the Japanese anime Kirarin Revolution. The song was released on October 29, 2008 and is performed by MilkyWay, consisting of Koharu Kusumi from Morning Musume, Sayaka Kitahara, and You Kikkawa from Hello Pro Egg as their characters, Kirari Tsukishima, Noel Yukino, and Kobeni Hanasaki.

Background and release

"Tan Tan Tān!" is the seventh opening theme song to Kirarin Revolution and is performed by Koharu Kusumi from Morning Musume, Sayaka Kitahara, and You Kikkawa from Hello Pro Egg, who play the characters Kirari Tsukishima, Noel Yukino, and Kobeni Hanasaki. The song was released as MilkyWay's second single.

The single was released on October 29, 2008 under the Zetima label. "Gamushalala", the twelfth ending theme song to Kirarin Revolution, was included as a B-side and is also performed by MilkyWay.

A video single, referred as a "Single V", was released on November 5, 2008.

Music video
The music video was directed by Toshiyuki Suzuki. The costumes were designed by the winner of a contest held by Ciao, of which the results were announced in the July 2008 issue. Kusumi picked it as one of her favorite outfits in Kirarin Revolution. The Starlight Headset and Starlight Tambourine featured in the music video were re-released as deluxe set by Takara Tomy.

Reception

The CD single debuted at #8 in the Oricon Weekly Singles Chart and charted for 10 weeks. The single sold 16,667 physical copies on its first week. The video single charted at #23 on the Oricon Weekly DVD Charts.

Track listing

Single

DVD single

Charts

Single

DVD single

References

2008 singles
2008 songs
Anime songs
Children's television theme songs
Hello! Project songs
Kirarin Revolution
Songs written by Kenichi Maeyamada
Animated series theme songs
Zetima Records singles